Varazdat Haroyan (born on 24 August 1992) is an Armenian professional footballer who plays as a central defender for Cypriot club Anorthosis Famagusta and the Armenia national team.

Club career

Patani and Pyunik Yerevan 
Varazdat Haroyan was born in Yerevan, and started football at the football school Pyunik Yerevan. In 2008, he played for Patani, for whom he made 17 appearances. 

In 2009, he made his debut as a starter for Pyunik in the Armenian Premier League match against Gandzasar in Yerevan. Haroyan came off the bench in place of Arthur Yedigaryan at 90 minutes. That season Pyunik became the 2009 Armenian Premier League champion. Starting in 2010, Haroyan had always been a team regular, and becoming the 2010 Armenian Premier League champion and the winning the 2010 Armenian Cup and 2010 Armenian Supercup.

In March 2012, he became known to the interest of the German club 1. FC Köln, which sent an official invitation to Haroyan. Haroyan was earlier invited to attend the viewing, but in March 2012, decided to go to Germany.

Padideh
On 6 June 2016, Haroyan signed a two–year contract with Persian Gulf Pro League side Tractor Sazi. However, just one day later the transfer was cancelled by Tractor Sazi management after Tractor Sazi's supporters protests due to historical conflicts between Armenian and Azerbaijani ethnic.

Just hours after Haroyan's contract with Tractor Sazi were cancelled, he joined to another Iranian club, Mashhad based Padideh.

Ural Yekaterinburg
On 5 July 2017, he signed a contract with the Russian Premier League club FC Ural Yekaterinburg. On 22 September 2020, his contract with Ural was terminated by mutual consent.

Days after leaving Ural, Haroyan postponed a transfer to Greek club AEL Larissa due to the 2020 Nagorno-Karabakh conflict. He later clarified that he was not enlisting to fight in the conflict.

Tambov
On 6 October 2020, Haroyan joined Russian Premier League club Tambov.

Astana
On 15 February 2021, Astana announced the signing of Haroyan.

Cadiz
On 27 May 2021, Cádiz announced the signing of Haroyan from Astana, on a two-year contract, with Astana confirming his departure from their club on 24 June 2021. He made his La Liga debut for Cádiz, starting in a 1–1 draw against Levante on 14 August 2021. Cádiz and Haroyan terminated their contract on 4 July 2022.

Anorthosis Famagusta
On 12 July 2022, Haroyan signed with Cypriot First Division club Anorthosis Famagusta on a two-year contract until 2024.

International career
Haroyan made his debut for the Armenia national team on 10 August 2011 in a friendly match against Lithuania. He made his debut in official matches on 11 June 2013 in a 4–0 win versus Denmark.

Career statistics

Club

International 

Scores and results list Armenia's goal tally first, score column indicates score after each Haroyan goal.

Honours
Pyunik Yerevan
Armenian Premier League: 2009, 2010, 2014–15
Armenian Cup: 2009, 2010, 2012–13, 2013–14, 2014–15
Armenian Supercup: 2010, 2011, 2015

Individual
Armenian Footballer of the Year: 2021

References

External links
 
 
 Profile at ffa.am
 
 

1992 births
Living people
Footballers from Yerevan
Armenian footballers
FC Pyunik players
Shahr Khodro F.C. players
FC Ural Yekaterinburg players
FC Tambov players
FC Astana players
Armenian Premier League players
Persian Gulf Pro League players
Armenian expatriate footballers
Russian Premier League players
Association football central defenders
Armenia youth international footballers
Armenia under-21 international footballers
Armenia international footballers
Expatriate footballers in Iran
Expatriate footballers in Russia
Expatriate footballers in Kazakhstan
Armenian expatriate sportspeople in Iran
Armenian expatriate sportspeople in Russia
Armenian expatriate sportspeople in Kazakhstan
Armenian expatriate sportspeople in Spain
Expatriate footballers in Spain
La Liga players
Cádiz CF players